Michael J. Zalewski is an American politician who served in the Illinois House of Representatives from December 2008 to January 2023. He represented District 23, located in the Chicago metropolitan area. He lost his bid to represent District 21 to Abdelnasser Rashid in the 2022 Democratic primary election.

His father is Michael R. Zalewski, a former Chicago city alderman.

Electoral history

References

External links
 Representative Michael J. Zalewski (D) at the Illinois General Assembly website
 100th, 99th, 98th, 97th, 96th, 95th
 State Representative Mike Zalewski constituent website
 Michael J. Zalewski at Illinois House Democrats

Lawyers from Chicago
Politicians from Chicago
University of Illinois Urbana-Champaign alumni
John Marshall Law School (Chicago) alumni
Democratic Party members of the Illinois House of Representatives
Living people
American politicians of Polish descent
Year of birth missing (living people)
21st-century American politicians